Wahgi is a Trans–New Guinea language of the Chimbu–Wahgi branch spoken by approximately 100,000 people in the highlands of Papua New Guinea. Like other Chimbu languages, Wahgi has some unusual lateral consonants.

Phonology

Consonants

The dental consonants are "distributed", with closure along a considerable distance of the vocal tract. This presumably means that they are laminal, and that the alveolar consonants are apical. The dental consonants have palatalized allophones in free variation.

The description of the (palatalized) dentals suggest they may be alveolo-palatal or something similar.

The nasal element of the prenasalized consonants is syllabic when not preceded by a vowel, but takes a noncontrastive low tone and is never stressed:  'but',  'we know'. Prenasalized consonants are perceived as single segments word-initially, but as nasal + stop word-medially.

The other consonants vary markedly, with most variants being positional:

The southern Kuma dialect has these three laterals, though the alveolar is rather uncommon. (The northern Danga dialect has two laterals, dental fricative and alveolar flap.) In locational forms with a suffix beginning with /t/, the /t/ is elided following the lateral, so that on the surface Wahgi distinguishes dental vs alveolar lateral fricatives and alveolar lateral fricatives vs flaps.

Vowels

In rapid speech, unstressed  elide between stressed syllables. For example, in rapid speech  is pronounced .

Tone and stress
Wahgi appears to have three word tones rather than phonemic tone on each syllable. At least one syllable will have a phonetic high tone, with the resulting patterns of high, rising and falling on words of one or two syllables, and peaking, rising and falling on words of three to five syllables. Stress also appears to be contrastive, but analysis is difficult.

On both monosyllabic and disyllabic words, the three tones are realized as high, rising and falling: [HH], [LH] and [HL]. An analysis of two phonemic syllable tones, HIGH and LOW, is complicated by the appearance of all three word tones on monosyllables with final occlusive codas (and phonetically short vowels).

In polysyllabic words, 
HIGH (H) is phonetically high, optionally extra high on stressed syllables. 
LOW (L) is phonetically falling on unstressed syllables at the end of a prosodic phrase. It is phonetically mid between a high tone and another low tone (i.e. the sequence /HLL/ is [HML] and /LLH/ is [LMH]). It is phonetically low elsewhere.

On trisyllables, the patterns LHL, HLL, and LLH are attested. On tetrasyllables are LLHL, LLLH, and LHHL (that is, LMHL, LLMH, LHHL). On pentasyllables, only two patterns have been found, LLHHH and LLHHL (that is, LMHHH and LMHHL).

Words with six to nine syllables are only attested with a single pattern, a peaking tone (LHL) on the first three syllables followed by a falling tone (HL) stretched out over the remaining syllables. For words of six syllables, this is realized as LHLHLL (phonetically LHLHML); for seven, LHLHLLL; for eight, LHLHHLLL; for nine LHLHHLLLL. In each case, the second syllable (the first high tone) is also stressed, and it is not clear if these are actually double-peaking tones or single peaking tones with preceding stress. Regardless, there does not appear to be any phonemic distinction.

Phonotactics
The maximal syllable in Wahgi is CVCC; the minimal syllable is V, which may be any vowel but . Any consonant may occur in the onset except the three laterals. Any consonant may occur in the coda except the semivowels and /ng/. With a coda consonant cluster, the first consonant may only be  (the two common laterals) and the second may only be .

A word may be anywhere from one to nine syllables long. A monosyllabic word may be any type of syllable but V and maybe CV. (Phonetic length and perhaps tone distribution suggests that words transcribed as CV monosyllables may actually be CVV with identical vowels.) Beside the syllable-onset and -coda restrictions,  may not occur word-initially and  may not occur word-finally.

In some cases (such as ) these sequences reduce across morpheme boundaries, and stress seems to play a role in vowel reduction. It may be that some of the difficulties in analyzing stress may be a conflation of vowel sequences across syllables with sequences in single heavy (bimoraic CVV) syllables.

Observed consonant clusters within words are those allowed as syllable codas, plus .

In rapid speech, the following additional combinations are known: .

Evolution

Below are some reflexes of proto-Trans-New Guinea proposed by Pawley (2012), drawn from Ramsey (1975):

To support his proto-Trans-New Guinea reconstructions, Pawley (2012) also cites probable reflexes in the Apali, Kalam, Kâte, Selepet, Binandere, Katei, Kiwai, Telefol, and Asmat languages.

Semantics

Colors
Middle Wahgi distinguishes 14 color terms (from Evelyn Ramsey 1975):
kuru ‘white, shades of off-white’
nganimb ‘black’
jipiɫ to- ‘be bluish-black’
numb ‘nearly black; a plant used for dyeing string a dark grey’
muk ‘true blue’
manngiɫ ‘blue-green’
kolnga ‘green; new; alive; raw, not fully cooked’
balu ‘light brown, rust-coloured’
bang ‘brown, red, orange, pink’
galngin ‘brown’
jilni ‘yellowish brown’
bulni ‘yellow; yellow dye from a plant’ (overlapping with gi ni- ‘be yellow, bright’ and gispe kerem ‘yellow, yellow-orange’)

Middle Wahgi has three types of contrasting color patterns.
pepe ‘striped’
mon punduk pandil ni pa- ‘be spotted, speckled’
ngingan ni sim ‘variegated colours, mottled’

Time
Middle Wahgi has at least a dozen words for days before or after, going far beyond ‘yesterday’ or ‘tomorrow’ (from Evelyn Ramsey 1975):
pi, opi ‘today’
toɫpa ‘tomorrow’
taɫ ‘day after tomorrow’
tolnge ‘yesterday’
tolnge taɫ ‘day before yesterday’
toi ‘4th day, i. e. 3 days from today’
amb tupuɫɫ ‘5th day from today’
yi tupuɫ ‘6th day from today’
kinwaɫ ‘7th day from today’
manwaɫ ‘8th day from today’
moɫwaɫ ‘9th day from today’
kialwaɫ ‘10th day from today’

Dictionary
The first dictionary of Middle Wahgi was published by Church of the Nazarene medical missionary Evelyn Ramsey in 1975.

References
Phillips, Donald (1976) Wahgi phonology and morphology. Pacific linguistics B, issue 36

External links 
 Organised Phonology Data
 Wahgi orthography, phonology, word list and sample passage 
 Paradisec has a number of collections that include Wahgi language materials, including one from Stephen A Wurm (SAW3).

Chimbu–Wahgi languages
Languages of Western Highlands Province
Languages of Simbu Province
Languages of Madang Province
Tonal languages